The 2021 British Grand Prix (officially known as the Monster Energy British Grand Prix) was the twelfth round of the 2021 Grand Prix motorcycle racing season. It was held at the Silverstone Circuit in Silverstone on 29 August 2021.

Qualifying

MotoGP

Race

MotoGP

 Lorenzo Savadori withdrew from the event due to effects of injury suffered at the Styrian Grand Prix.

Moto2

 Lorenzo Dalla Porta withdrew from the event due to a shoulder injury.

Moto3

Championship standings after the race
Below are the standings for the top five riders, constructors, and teams after the round.

MotoGP

Riders' Championship standings

Constructors' Championship standings

Teams' Championship standings

Moto2

Riders' Championship standings

Constructors' Championship standings

Teams' Championship standings

Moto3

Riders' Championship standings

Constructors' Championship standings

Teams' Championship standings

Notes

References

External links

British
Motorcycle Grand Prix
British motorcycle Grand Prix
Motorcycle Grand Prix